Massoud Massoud (born on 28 April 1940 in Al-Kafrun, Syria) is an emeritus bishop of the Maronite Catholic Eparchy of Latakia.

Life
Massoud Massoud received on 2 August 1970 his priestly ordination and was incardinated in the clergy of the Apostolic Administration of Laodicea.

Pope John Paul II appointed him on 23 June 2001 Bishop of Latakia. His episcopal ordination was performed by Maronite Patriarch of Antioch, Nasrallah Boutros Sfeir, on 8 September of the same year; his co-consecrators were Youhanna Fouad El-Hage, Archbishop of Tripoli of Lebanon, and Roland Aboujaoudé, auxiliary bishop in Antioch.

Massoud resigned on 5 June 2011 of his position as Maronite Eparch of Latakia.

References

External links
 http://www.catholic-hierarchy.org/bishop/bmassoud.html

1940 births
21st-century Maronite Catholic bishops
Syrian people
Living people